Badija is the largest island in archipelago Škoji, near Korčula island in Croatia.

The island is currently unpopulated. Franciscans from Bosnia came into possession of the island in 1398. They held it until 1949, when it was expropriated by the communist authorities.

References

Sources
Samostan Uznesenja B. D. Marije 

Islets of Croatia
Islands of the Adriatic Sea
Landforms of Dubrovnik-Neretva County